Family is a 2018 American comedy film written and directed by Laura Steinel in her directorial debut. It stars Taylor Schilling, Brian Tyree Henry,  Bryn Vale, Allison Tolman, Fabrizio Guido, Kate McKinnon and Peter Horton. It premiered at South by Southwest on March 11, 2018, and was released on April 19, 2019 by The Film Arcade.

It received positive reviews. Critics praised its comedy and plot twists, and Schilling's performance.

Plot 

A senior VP for a New Jersey hedge fund, Kate Stone is career-focused, egotistical and uninterested in forming friendships. Her attitude keeps people at arm's length, making her an unpopular loner in her own office.

Examples of Kate's behavior includes insulting a pregnant co-worker, disparaging her assistant's relationship with her brother and eating cake at a baby shower although she's not supportive. We see Kate at home, a heavy drinker who does so alone.

Kate's estranged brother Joe calls asking her to babysit her tween niece Maddie for one night. Initially refusing, she reluctantly agrees when realising she's their last option. But the overnight stay unexpectedly becomes a week as setting up hospice for Cheryl's mother is more complicated than expected, and Kate’s life becomes chaotic.

As Maddie reveals that she is bullied, isolated and angry, her parents try to force her into being more girlie. Signed up to ballet class in hopes that she make friends, she sneaks into the karate school next door.

The aunt and niece form a unique bond. Remembering not having it easy at that age either, Kate lets Maddie get a pants suit for the school dance, yet she’s meant to put on a dress. Moreover, a group of popular meanies torment her at school.

Seeing herself in Maddie and discovering her troubles slowly, Kate takes her under her wing. She allows her to go overboard with snacks at the local convenience store, where she meets a Juggalo, and she allows her chicken parmesan every night.

At the end of her first day at Maddie's, Kate finds that she has invited Dennis aka Baby Joker, the juggalo she met the previous evening. With the characteristic black and white clown-like face paint, she makes them remove it but lets him stay. He explains that juggalos are simply society's misfits who look out for each other like family.

That night, Kate and Maddie bond, Kate goes through some beauty tips while Maddie shares her various costumes and fighting sticks. She tells her to fight her bullies, however Kate is called in to the school because she literally fought them with karate. Sensei Peter is also called in, who later confides in Kate that he's impressed as she used a complicated firehouse kick.

Erin, a younger analyst Kate trains, seems to become a threat to her career. While Kate was out dealing with the school suspension, Erin was schmoosing up to potential clients. She organises a client meeting for 8 pm on Friday, so Kate goes back on her word and leaves Maddie at the school dance.

Maddie isn't allowed in the dance as she's not in a dress. Kate catches up with her, but she's vomiting. Taking her to the hospital, Joe and Cheryl show up and they find out Maggie got ill because her tomato sensitivity had been ignored.

Kate leaves, and for some days is very unhappy. She decides to go to the dojo to see Maddie, but Pete hasn't seen her. Joe and Cheryl show up to get Maddie from ballet and find out she changed to karate.

Kate, as she knows Maddie's true interests, seeks Baby Joker and discovers there is a Juggalos gathering. She gets the face paint and goes in. Although they seem intimidating, the juggalos help Kate find the rebellious Maddie.

In the end, Kate learns to interact better with others, she loosens up at work, finally making friends, having an improved relationship with her family and finally smiling.

Cast

 Taylor Schilling as Kate, Joe’s sister, and Maddie’s aunt
 Brian Tyree Henry as Pete
 Bryn Vale as Maddie, Kate’s niece, and Cheryl and Joe’s daughter
 Allison Tolman as Cheryl, Joe’s wife, and Maddie’s mother
 Jessie Ennis as Erin
 Matt Walsh as Dan
 Eric Edelstein as Joe, Kate’s brother, Cheryl’s husband, and Maddie’s father
 Fabrizio Guido as Dennis
 Peter Horton as Charlie
 Blair Beeken as Barb
 Karan Kendrick as Sarah
 Kate McKinnon as Jill
 Christopher Bianculli as Sparring Boy

The hip hop duo Insane Clown Posse, Violent J and Shaggy 2 Dope—credited under their real names, Joseph Bruce and Joseph Utsler—also appear as MCs for the Miss Juggalette Pageant, where Natasha Lyonne appears as a Juggalette.

Release
Family premiered at South by Southwest on March 11, 2018. The Film Arcade acquired its distribution rights in September 2018 and released it April 19, 2019.

Critical response

The website's critics consensus reads, "The definitive juggalo-infused self-discovery comedy, Family transcends its overly familiar elements with fresh twists and Taylor Schilling's appealing performance."

References

External links
 

2018 films
American comedy films
Stage 6 Films films
2018 directorial debut films
2018 comedy films
2010s English-language films
2010s American films